Wila Qullu Punta (Aymara wila blood, blood-red, qullu mountain, also spelled Huila Kkollu Punta, Wila Kkollu Punta) is a  mountain in the Bolivian Andes. It is located in the Cochabamba Department, Quillacollo Province, Quillacollo Municipality.

References 

Mountains of Cochabamba Department